The 2015 IWBF Men's European Championship was the 22nd edition of the European Wheelchair Basketball Championship held in Worcester, Great Britain  from 28 August to 6 September 2015.

Nations ranked 1 to 5 are qualified for participation at the 2016 Summer Paralympics in Rio de Janeiro, Brazil.

Squads
Each of the 12 teams selected a squad of 12 players for the tournament.

Athletes are given an eight-level-score specific to wheelchair basketball, ranging from 0.5 to 4.5. Lower scores represent a higher degree of disability The sum score of all players on the court cannot exceed 14.

Preliminary round
All times local (UTC+02:00)

Group A

Group B

Knockout stage

Final standings

References

European Wheelchair Basketball Championship
2015 in wheelchair basketball
2015–16 in British basketball
2015–16 in European basketball
International basketball competitions hosted by the United Kingdom
Wheelchair basketball in the United Kingdom
Sport in Worcester, England
2010s in Worcestershire